Geoffrey of Trani (? in Trano, Apulia – 1245) was an Italian jurist, known as a canon lawyer. He was a student at Bologna of Azo before becoming a professor at Naples, then at Bologna. He was made a cardinal deacon by Pope Innocent IV. His Summa super titulis decretalium and other writings on decretals became a basic resource for canon law.

Notes

1245 deaths
13th-century Italian jurists
Canon law jurists
Economic history of the Holy See
Year of birth unknown
13th-century Latin writers